Shane Emmett (born 4 January 1976) is an Australian actor, presenter and film-maker.

Early life 

Emmett was born in Gosford, NSW, to Michael and Laraine Emmett, and grew up in Umina Beach on the Central Coast of New South Wales.  He is the third of four children (Lesley, Belinda, and Matthew). Emmett attended St John The Baptist primary school in Woy Woy and St Edward's Christian Brothers College and Corpus Christi College, graduating in 1993.

Career 

Emmett began acting while completing a degree in Communications at Macquarie University in 1998.

He first gained recognition in 2003 for his performance of the lead Frank Marlow in the musical Get Happy in Sydney. Emmett has also performed as Frank Sinatra in the musical From Here To Eternity, Marius in Les Misérables and Captain Von Trapp in The Sound of Music. 

In 2006 Emmett performed at the annual Carols in the Domain following the death of his sister Belinda. He performed "One Sweet Day" accompanied by footage of Belinda singing behind him.

Emmett has also acted on television, playing Aiden O'Hara in All Saints, Colin Lowndes in Rush, Dr Patrick in Offspring and Mark Gilmour in Home and Away. He portrayed the editor of The Australian Max Newton in the biographical miniseries Power Games: The Packer-Murdoch War and Clayton Timms in the Universal TV series Precinct 13.

Emmett is also known for his work as a presenter on the television morning show 9am with David & Kim in 2009 as well as Good Morning Australia, GMA and The Morning Show in 2009 and 2011.

Emmett has produced and created several internationally recognized short films with his filmmaking partner Jason Van Genderen. He won both 'Best Film' and 'People's Choice Award' in Tropfest New York in 2008 with the film "Mankind Is No Island". The film was shot entirely on a cell phone and won Best Short Documentary at the Inside Film Awards in 2009.

References

External links 
 Official Website

Australian male television actors
1976 births
Living people